Bonsall may refer to:

Bonsall (surname)
Bonsall, California
Bonsall, Derbyshire, England
Bonsall Islands, Avannaata municipality, Greenland

See also
Bonsal (disambiguation)
Bonsallo Avenue, Los Angeles, California